{{DISPLAYTITLE:C10H15N3}}
The molecular formula C10H15N3 (molar mass: 177.25 g/mol, exact mass: 177.1266 u) may refer to:

 Bethanidine  (or betanidine)
 TC-1827